Drink Me is the second studio album by English alternative rock band Queenadreena, released in 2002. Since the band switched labels from Rough Trade to One Little Indian, the album became out of print and has become somewhat of a collector's item. The original British pressing of the album featured a controversial hidden image in the jewel casing. One Little Indian records have stated that there are no plans to re-release the album.

Critical response
Drowned in Sound awarded the album seven out of ten stars, writing: "[Queenadreena] break the mould in one sense at least – it’s as much Garside’s star qualities as her not-entirely-unattractive deranged and semi-dressed demeanour that carries the group. But for all her unhinged charisma, there is one major problem with ‘Drink Me’the rest of the band back Garside with an awful slosh of uninspired turgid sub-metal shite that nearly sank [the band] without a trace first time around. And with the exception of the bulldozing "Pretty Like Drugs" underpinning and a few more startling riffs scattered like afterthoughts, that’s simply a let down." Rock Feed Back magazine awarded the album three out of four stars, adding: "Don't allow the opening torrents of 70s-esque heavy-metal riffage falsely lead you; Queenadreena are dangerously sexy art-rock, a group free to roam the lyrical subject-matters others are too refined to touch, and an act confident enough to lead you down their dark alley of forbidden delights - without so much as even a mere inkling of embarrassment."

Track listing

Singles
Pretty Like Drugs (CD, Rough Trade, 2002)
"Pretty Like Drugs" (Garside, Gray, Wajih)
"Beneath The Skin" (Garside, Gray)

Personnel
Queenadreena
KatieJane Garsidevocals
Crispin Grayguitar
Orson Wajihbass
Pete Howarddrums

Technical personnel
Morgan Nichollsproduction
Ken Thomasproduction
Queenadreenaproduction

References

External links

 

2002 albums
Queenadreena albums
Albums produced by Ken Thomas (record producer)
Rough Trade Records albums
One Little Independent Records albums